Henry Hiram "Smoky" Harris (April 28, 1905 – December 31, 1975) was a Canadian professional ice hockey player. Harris played in the Prairie Hockey League (PHL), Pacific Coast Hockey League (PCHL) and the National Hockey League (NHL). Harris played 32 games for the Boston Bruins during the 1930–31 season, which had several years earlier employed his brother Smokey. He was born in Kenora, Ontario.

Playing career
Harris first played senior-level hockey in 1927–28 for the Regina Capitals of the Prairie Hockey League. After one season, Harris transferred to the Seattle Eskimos of the Pacific Coast Hockey League. Harris played two seasons for the Eskimos before being traded to the Boston Bruins of the NHL. However, he did not join Boston right away as Boston loaned him back to Seattle for the rest of the 1929–30 season. The following season, Harris travelled to Boston, and played 32 games for the Bruins and twelve games for the Bruins' affiliate Boston Tigers. That was the only season in the NHL for him as he was not re-signed. He caught on with the Buffalo Majors for one season before returning west to play with the Calgary Tigers of the North West Hockey League. Harris played three seasons for the Tigers.

He died in Winnipeg in 1975 and was interred in Elmwood Cemetery.

Career statistics

Regular season and playoffs

References

External links
 

1905 births
1975 deaths
Boston Bruins players
Boston Tigers (CAHL) players
Buffalo Majors players
Calgary Tigers players
Canadian ice hockey left wingers
Ice hockey people from Ontario
Regina Capitals players
Seattle Eskimos players
Sportspeople from Kenora
Canadian expatriate ice hockey players in the United States